Kamanna Mallanna (7 April 1926 – 1 March 2000) was an Indian politician, elected to the Lok Sabha, the lower house of the Parliament of India as a member of the Indian National Congress.

Mallanna died on 1 March 2000, at the age of 73.

References

External links
Official biographical sketch in Parliament of India website

1926 births
2000 deaths
India MPs 1971–1977
India MPs 1977–1979
India MPs 1980–1984
Lok Sabha members from Karnataka